Chromodoris dictya is a species of colourful sea slug, a dorid nudibranch, a marine gastropod mollusc in the family Chromodorididae.

Distribution 
This species was described from Vega Bay, Puerto Rico.

Description
Chromodoris dictya was described from a single preserved specimens and no details of its living colouration are known. As no species belonging to the restricted view of the genus Chromodoris have been discovered in the Atlantic Ocean and this species is described as similar to Glossodoris moerchi it should probably be placed in Glossodoris.

References

Chromodorididae
Gastropods described in 1970